Sandved Idrettslag is a Norwegian sports club from Sandnes. It has sections for association football and volleyball.

The men's football team currently plays in the Fourth Division, the fifth tier of Norwegian football. The team last contested the Third Division from 2006 to 2010. The team colours are white and green.

The club formerly (from 1980) had a section for speed skating, but it broke away in 1990 to form Sandnes SK.

References

 Official site 

Football clubs in Norway
Sport in Sandnes
Association football clubs established in 1980
1980 establishments in Norway